The 2015–16 Temple Owls basketball team represented Temple University during the 2015–16 NCAA Division I men's basketball season. The Owls, led by tenth year head coach Fran Dunphy, played their home games at the Liacouras Center and were members the American Athletic Conference. They finished the season with a record 21–12, 14–4 in AAC play to win the regular season championship. They defeated South Florida in the quarterfinals of the AAC tournament to advance to the semifinals where they lost to UConn. They received an at-large bid as a #10 seed to the NCAA tournament where they lost in the first round to Iowa.

Previous season 
The Owls finished the 2014–15 season with a record 26–11, 13–5 in AAC play to finish in a tie for third place in conference. They advanced to the semifinals of the AAC tournament before losing to SMU. They received a bid to the National Invitation Tournament where they defeated Bucknell, George Washington, and Louisiana Tech to advance to the semifinals of the NIT at Madison Square Garden. There they lost to Miami (FL).

Departures

Incoming Recruits

Recruiting Class of 2016

Roster

Schedule 

|-
!colspan=12 style=""| Regular season
|-

|-
!colspan=12 style=""|American Athletic Tournament

|-
!colspan=12 style=""|NCAA tournament

References

Temple Owls men's basketball seasons
Temple
Temple
Temple
Temple